Chuguyevsky District may refer to:
Chuguyevsky District, a district in Primorsky Krai, Russia
Chuhuivskyi Raion,  a district in Kharkiv Oblast, Ukraine